"Believe in Me" is the third single by American rock musician Lenny Kravitz from his 2001 sixth self-titled studio album Lenny, released on April 23, 2002 by Virgin Records America.

Chart performance
The single performed very well on the European countries, being the most successful single of the album in Austria (where it peaked at number 42), Portugal (where it peaked at number six), the Netherlands (where it reached number seven), and Switzerland (where it reached number 29). In Italy, it reached the top 10, becoming the second song of the album to reach the top 10 there.

Music video
The music video features Lenny performing in a small club setting in front of an audience full of people of different ages, races and walks of life. Kravitz is singing soulfully to the woman that he is in love with, while flashing images of the Virgin Mary and Jesus Christ appear in the club. Another scene shows back and forth imaging of the woman and of a shirtless, frustrated Kravitz boxing and lifting weights in his exercise room. The instrumental bridge features choreographed break dancers as Kravitz plays Spanish guitar, while in the end Kravitz and the woman are seen dancing together amongst the large crowd of people. The video features American model Megan Ewing.

Track listing
 "Believe in Me"
 "Yesterday Is Gone (My Dear Kay)"
 "A Million Miles Away"
 "Stillness of Heart" (Video)

Charts

Weekly charts

Year-end charts

References

External links
Lenny Kravitz official site

2002 singles
2002 songs
Lenny Kravitz songs
Song recordings produced by Lenny Kravitz
Songs written by Lenny Kravitz
Trip hop songs